The 2009 Scheldeprijs cycling race took place on 15 April 2009. It was the 97th running of the Scheldeprijs. A breakaway of Lorenzo Bernucci, Matthé Pronk, Pavel Brutt and Jeff Louder formed after 80 km, and stayed free of the peloton until 9 km to go. The two were caught again by the Quickstep-led peloton at 4 km to go. A bunch sprint ensued, won by Alessandro Petacchi. Robbie McEwen, Tom Boonen and Greg Van Avermaet crashed 200 m from the finish when their wheels touched.

Results

External links

2009
Scheldeprijs
Scheldeprijs